The Financial Review Rich List 2021 is the 38th annual survey of the 200 wealthiest people resident in Australia, published by the Australian Financial Review on 27 May 2021. 

The net worth of the wealthiest individual, Gina Rinehart, was $31.06 billion; while the net worth of the 200th wealthiest individual, Douglas Clarke, was {590 million; up from $540 million for the 200th individual in 2020. The combined wealth of the 200 individuals was calculated as $479.6 bn, an increase of $55.6 bn on the previous year; compared with a combined wealth of $6.4 bn in 1984 when the BRW Rich 200 commenced. Thirty-nine women were included on the 2021 Rich List, representing 19.5 percent of the list; up from thirty women in 2020, or 12 percent. The list included eighteen debutants.

Rinehart held the mantle of Australia's wealthiest individual between 2011 and 2015; and was also the wealthiest Australian individual in 2020. From 2017 to 2019, Anthony Pratt was Australia's wealthiest individual, ranked fourth in the 2021 Rich List, after Andrew Forrest, Australia's wealthiest individual in 2008, and Mike Cannon-Brookes. Harry Triguboff was Australia's wealthiest individual in 2016, ranked sixth in the 2021 Rich List.

List of individuals 

{| class="wikitable"
!colspan="2"|Legend
|-
! Icon
! Description
|-
|
|Has not changed from the previous year's list
|-
|
|Has increased from the previous year's list
|-
|
|Has decreased from the previous year's list
|}

Removed from the 2021 list 
The following individuals, who appeared on the Financial Review Rich List 2020, did not appear on the 2021 list:

Notes 
: Individual was listed on a previous year's list, that was not the 2020 Rich List.
: Previous years' listing was in the name of Frank Costa who died on 2 May 2021.

See also
 Financial Review Rich List
 Forbes Asia list of Australians by net worth

References

External links 

2021 in Australia
2021